St Philip's Marsh Adult School Football Club was an English association football club based in the St Philip's Marsh area of Bristol. They were founded in 1919 and won Division Two of the Bristol and District Football League in their first season.

FA Cup results
St Philip's Marsh Adult School played in the FA Cup throughout the 1930s, 40s and 50s. This table shows the progress that the team made through the qualifying rounds of the FA Cup each season that they entered it. A W in a cell indicates that they won that match, a WR that they won after a replay, and a L that they were defeated.

References

Defunct football clubs in England
Defunct football clubs in Bristol
Association football clubs established in 1919
1919 establishments in England
Association football clubs disestablished in the 20th century